Marc Deuquet (16 October 1933 – 18 December 2009) was a French equestrian. He competed in the team jumping event at the 1972 Summer Olympics.

References

1933 births
2009 deaths
French male equestrians
Olympic equestrians of France
Equestrians at the 1972 Summer Olympics
Place of birth missing